Gur Abjir (also Romanized as Gūr Ābjīr and Goorab Jir; also known as Gurabir and Gūrābjīr-e Şaḩrā) is a village in Chapar Khaneh Rural District, Khomam District, Rasht County, Gilan Province, Iran. At the 2006 census, its population was 1,698, in 531 families.

References 

Populated places in Rasht County